Gahnia procera is a tussock-forming perennial in the family Cyperaceae, that is native to parts of New Zealand.

References

procera
Plants described in 1776
Flora of New Zealand
Taxa named by Johann Reinhold Forster
Taxa named by Georg Forster